Solnechny is an urban locality (an urban-type settlement) in Ust-Maysky District of the Sakha Republic, Russia, located  from Ust-Maya, the administrative center of the district. As of the 2010 Census, its population was 1,034. It is located near the slopes of the Ulakhan-Bom range.

History

Urban-type settlement status was granted to it in 1972.

Administrative and municipal status
Within the framework of administrative divisions, the urban-type settlement of Solnechny, together with one rural locality (the selo of Ust-Ynykchan), is incorporated within Ust-Maysky District as the Settlement of Solnechny. As a municipal division, the Settlement of Solnechny is incorporated within Ust-Maysky Municipal District as Solnechny Urban Settlement.

References

Notes

Sources
Official website of the Sakha Republic. Registry of the Administrative-Territorial Divisions of the Sakha Republic. Ust-Maysky District. 

Urban-type settlements in the Sakha Republic